Linguistics Vanguard is a peer-reviewed academic journal of general linguistics that was established in 2015 and is published by De Gruyter. Its editors-in-chief are Alexander Bergs, Abigail C. Cohn and Jeff Good. The journal aims to publish "concise and up-to-date reports on the state of the art in linguistics as well as cutting-edge research papers."

References

External links

Linguistics journals
Publications established in 2015
English-language journals
Hybrid open access journals
De Gruyter academic journals
Annual journals